Zelleria porphyraula is a moth in the family Yponomeutidae. It is endemic to New Zealand.

References

Yponomeutidae
Moths described in 1927
Moths of New Zealand
Endemic fauna of New Zealand
Taxa named by Edward Meyrick
Endemic moths of New Zealand